This bibliography of Shibli Nomani is a selected list of generally available scholarly resources related to Shibli Nomani, a poet, philosopher, historian, educational thinker, author, orator, reformer, critic of orientalists and Islamic scholar from Indian subcontinent during the British Raj, regarded as the father of Urdu historiography. He didn't write an autobiography during his lifetime. However, he bequeathed it to his disciple Sulaiman Nadvi. Accordingly Sulaiman Nadvi composed Hayat-e-Shibli in 1943. This list will include his biographies, theses written on him and articles published about him in various journals, newspapers, encyclopedias, seminars, websites etc. in APA style.

Encyclopedias

Biographies

Theses

Journals

Newspapers

Seminars

Websites

Other

Theses

Books

See also 
 Timeline of Shibli Nomani

References

External links 
 

Shibli Nomani
Islam-related lists
Bibliographies of people
Indian biographies
Deobandi-related bibliographies
Lists of books